Armies Of Death is a single-player roleplaying gamebook written by Ian Livingstone, illustrated by Nik Williams and originally published in 1988 by Puffin Books. It was later republished by Wizard Books in 2003. It forms part of Steve Jackson and Ian Livingstone's Fighting Fantasy series. 

It is the 36th in the series in the original Puffin series and 14th in the modern Wizard series.

Rules

The story features an additional game mechanic: both the player's character and their army have attributes for combat, as there is a combination of individual and mass battles.

Story

Armies of Death is a direct sequel to the Fighting Fantasy title Trial of Champions. The player assumes the role of the winner of the Trial. With the continent Allansia threatened by the evil Shadow Demon Agglax and his growing undead army, the adventurer must use their newfound-riches to raise an army to stop the threat. Despite being a sequel storywise, the gameplay has little in common with the two previous entries, as the player is no longer exploring a dungeon.

External links
 
 
 
 
 

1988 fiction books
Fighting Fantasy gamebooks
Books by Ian Livingstone